Zirjan or Zir Jan may refer to:
 Zirjan, Gonabad
 Zirjan, Nishapur